HMS Triton was a 32-gun fifth-rate frigate of the Royal Navy designed by James Gambier and launched in 1796 at Deptford. Triton was an experimental ship and the only one built to that design; she was constructed out of fir due to wartime supply shortages of more traditional materials and had some unusual features such as no tumblehome. Her namesake was the Greek god Triton, a god of the sea. She was commissioned in June 1796 under Captain John Gore, with whom she would spend the majority of her active service, to serve in the Channel in the squadron of Sir John Warren.

Triton was a successful ship, serving throughout the majority of the French Revolutionary Wars and Napoleonic Wars in several capacities. She took a large number of warships and traders as prizes in the Channel and Mediterranean Sea during her service as a blockade ship and cruiser. Triton also played a prominent role in several small-scale battles, including the action of 16 October 1799 where she assisted in the capture of two powerful Spanish frigates and earned her captain one of the largest sums of prize money of the war. Her unique design was ultimately flawed, limiting her sailing abilities, and Triton only served at sea for seven years before being converted into a hulk in 1803. She served as a receiving ship and guard ship before being either sold at Plymouth in 1814 or broken up in Newfoundland in 1820.

Construction

Triton was a 32-gun, 12-pounder frigate. She was a 'one-off' ship, built to the designs of the First Naval Lord James Gambier. She was unusually constructed of fir instead of oak due to financial and operational necessity. As per her nature as a 'one-off' experimental ship, she had a number of unique features, being described as 'the most singular frigate design of the period'. She was wall-sided instead of incorporating a tumblehome, had almost no sheer, and had a sharply overhanging bow. These uniquely squared off elements of the ship came about because of the difficulties the Royal Navy had in obtaining naturally curved pieces of wood and as an experiment for improving sailing qualities. Triton was also fitted with 'air pipes' which ran to the lower deck to assist in ventilating the usually stuffy area. She measured 855 tons burthen.

Triton was launched on 5 September 1796 and fitted out between 6 September and 31 October at Deptford. She had originally been intended to hold 18-pound guns rather than the 12-pounders she actually had; this was changed because of fears that the power of the larger guns would have been too much for the ship to withstand when firing. While 32-gun 12-pounder frigates had been the standard of the Royal Navy for years prior, the advent of larger French 38-gun frigates meant that by the time of Tritons construction her armament was a rarity, and she was the only such example built until 1804. Worries over Triton would continue, with later proposals looking to downgrade her further to 9-pounders. The experimental vertical sides and the very limited sheer meant that Triton was not a weatherly ship, while her peculiar bow caused her to slam heavily into waves. She required a very large amount of ballast, as she was also the shallowest frigate of the period, which made the ship roll greatly.Gardiner, Heavy Frigate, p. 73 Furthermore, her steering issues would have been exacerbated by her being designed to float on an even keel, rather than with more weight to the stern as was traditional.

While Gore noted the difficulties with rolling and the bow he was pleased with the speed of the ship, saying that ‘we have fore-reached on everything we have met with’. The ship's surgeon was also pleased with the new 'air pipes', reporting that they had a positive effect on the health of the crew and rid the ship of the ‘thick noxious foul air’ that could usually be found on lower decks. Despite these benefits provided by Gambier's design, the timbers of the ship were put under considerable wear by Triton'''s abnormal sailing qualities, directly impacting her length of active service.

ServiceTriton was commissioned in September 1796 by Captain John Gore, who would command her almost unbrokenly until 1801. Gore had recently returned from French captivity after he had been forced to surrender his command of the newly captured Le Censeur in 1795. From the launching of Triton until March 1797, the brother of Jane Austen and future Admiral of the Fleet Francis Austen served on board as a lieutenant.Austen-Leigh, Jane Austen, p. 91

Sir John Warren's squadronTriton began active service in early 1797 by joining the blockading squadron of Sir John Warren in the English Channel. On 10 February she captured the French 14-gun privateer cutter Recovery, which was recently out of Le Havre and with a crew of forty-six had already taken a British smuggler and the American trader Atlantic which was retaken the same day. On 11 February she took the 10-gun privateer brig Jeune Emilie, which was forty days out of Saint-Malo and had taken the sloop Friendship as well as the 10-gun letter of marque .Schomberg, Naval Chronology, p. 122 Continuing her string of successes, Triton took the 18-gun privateer La Difficile only a day after this.Duncan, British Trident, p. 111

Resistance and Constance
On 9 March 1797 the British frigates HMS St Fiorenzo and HMS Nymphe spotted two French ships while returning from a reconnoitre of Brest. These ships were the 40-gun frigate Résistance and 22-gun corvette Constance. The two ships were attempting to return to France after participating in the landing of French troops at Fishguard on 22 February. St Fiorenzo and Nymphe quickly engaged the ships, despite the French Brest fleet being just over the horizon, first attacking Résistance which soon surrendered, followed around ten minutes later by Constance. At the close of the action, which would see Résistance purchased into the navy as Fishguard, Triton hove into sight alongside the ship-of-the-line HMS Robust; it has been suggested that the arrival of Triton and Robust facilitated the quick capture of the two French ships, however they did not play any part in the action itself. Triton was more successful in reaching action after this, capturing the trader La Zoes on 12 June while sailing with a number of Warren's ships, and Boston on 25 July, now with a different part of the squadron.

Convoy attacks

On 11 August Triton was sailing under Warren, with the frigates HMS Pomone and HMS Jason, and the brig-sloop HMS Sylph, off the coast of La Vendée. There, the squadron encountered a French convoy of brigs and chasse-marées protected by the 20-gun corvette Réolaise and a number of gun-boats. Upon seeing the threat, the convoy ran towards the Les Sables-d'Olonne river. The mouth of the river was protected by a fort which the convoy hoped would deter the squadron; however, Commander John Chambers White of Sylph volunteered to go in and attack the anchored ships, and was followed by Pomone and Jason half an hour later. The bombardment from the three ships sank the gun-boat guarding the river and heavily damaged Réolaise; Triton meanwhile had been chasing other ships of the convoy away. The attack on the convoy heavily disrupted the supplying of the naval base at Brest. The next day, the four ships took the trader Admiralitat.Triton continued as part of the same squadron, and on 27 August discovered another French convoy around the mouth of the river Gironde. The squadron chased the convoy overnight; Triton and Jason were the fastest of the British and were able to capture five of the ships, which were likely Trois Soeurs, Egalité, St. Peter, St. Ann, and Dauphin. The convoy was carrying ship timbers, rosin, and tar, intended to help fit out new French privateers.

Blockade and Channel work

After these convoy actions Triton continued to patrol the Channel as a part of Warren's squadron, which for a brief period of time from March 1798 was commanded by Commodore John Willett Payne. The independent nature of the squadron had by this time been curtailed by the arrival of Admiral Lord Bridport to command the Brest blockade, with Triton now involving herself more in close blockade work. On 14 October 1797 while in company with the brig-sloop HMS Childers, she took the 4-gun privateer Le Furet near Île de Batz which was twenty-three days out of Tréguier and had fifty-three men on board. Near the end of the year she also took the privateer La Helene.Schomberg, Naval Chronology, p. 136

Action of 30 June 1798

On 24 April 1798 the French 40-gun frigate Seine sailed from Port Louis, the capital of Mauritius, with 280 garrison troops onboard after being recalled from the Indian Ocean. At 7 a.m. on 29 June, Seine was sighted by Jason and the frigates HMS Pique, and HMS Mermaid off Brittany. At around 1:35 a.m. a long chase by the three frigates was concluded when Jason, Pique, and Seine all grounded on rocks off La Tranche-sur-Mer; dismasted, Seine surrendered as Mermaid approached. At this time Triton was serving in a small blockading squadron commanded by Captain Robert Stopford and consisting of Stopford's frigate HMS Phaeton alongside St Fiorenzo and Triton; all part of Warren's larger squadron. The squadron was called in by signal gun by Jason, as a force of French ships including two large frigates and a brig were leaving Rochelle with the intent of attacking the captors of Seine.Duncan, British Trident, p. 130 The arrival of Stopford's squadron saved them from French attack, with William James arguing that without the intervention of Triton and the squadron, the situation 'would have been extremely critical'.

On 28 September Triton took the 5-gun schooner L'Arraigne as she attempted a passage from Bermeo to the Gulf of Saint Lawrence. Towards the end of 1798, Captain Gore was indisposed and temporarily replaced with Edward Griffith. Throughout this period Triton continued to serve alongside St Fiorenzo; on 11 and 12 December the ships captured the Spanish 4-gun privateer St. Joseph, the brand new French 14-gun brig La Rosée, and recaptured the trader George which had been captured while sailing to Lisbon with coal, copper, and bottles.Schomberg, Naval Chronology, p. 149 On 31 December Triton had parted company with St Fiorenzo, and captured the 14-gun privateer brig L'Impromptu which had recently left Corunna.Phillips, Triton (32) (1796). Michael Phillips' Ships of the Old Navy. Retrieved 19 March 2021.

Action of 18 June 1799

From late January 1799, Gore returned to command Triton as part of the squadron of Vice-Admiral Sir Charles Thompson. On 29 January Gore forced a 16-gun cutter under the guns of the garrison of Guernsey, which then surrendered to the soldiers there. She took the 18-gun L'Aimable Victoire the next day after a chase of eight and a half hours. Victoire had sailed from Cherbourg on 28 January and had eighty-six men on board. By 13 March Triton was sailing with the frigates HMS Cambrian, HMS Naiad, and St Fiorenzo, together taking the merchant brig Victoire. A prize crew from Triton was assigned to take Victoire to Plymouth, but she foundered at her moorings off St Nicholas Island with her cargo of wine, brandy, and cordage still on board. In this period Triton also took the Spanish brig San Joachim with Cambrian.

On 25 April Triton was dispatched to Admiral Lord St Vincent in the Mediterranean Sea with news that the French fleet at Brest had escaped the blockade.Ralfe, Naval Biography, p. 466 This information was communicated to St Vincent's second in command, Vice-Admiral Lord Keith, whose fleet Triton then joined. In June Triton was still a part of this fleet of twenty-nine ships under Lord Keith. On 18 June the fleet encountered a squadron of French frigates under the command of Rear-Admiral Jean-Baptiste Perrée attempting to return to Toulon from Syria. A chase ensued and the frigates Courageuse, Alceste, and Junon, along with the brigs Salamine and Alerte were captured. It was deemed that Triton was one of the nine 'actual captors' of the French ships at the action.

During this period Lord Keith had Triton and two other frigates search for the escaped French fleet from Toulon to Cadiz. The three ships discovered them in Cadiz, where the combined fleet amounted to thirty-eight ships of the line.Ralfe, Naval Biography, p. 467 The enemy fleet left Cadiz on 21 July, and after its frigates failed to chase Triton off her station Captain Gore ascertained that the fleet was sailing for Brest again. Triton overtook the enemy and arrived at Plymouth with the news of the fleet five days before it reached Brest. Triton was then sent to watch over the fleet in Brest with a squadron of frigates. While doing so, they deterred a Spanish squadron of five ships of the line and two frigates from entering the port through the Passage du Raz. Triton was then involved in the chase of the Spaniards, again in a squadron commanded by (now Rear-Admiral) Warren, who retreated to Ferrol and dismantled their ships.

Action of 16 October 1799

Warren ordered Triton to watch the Spanish ships inside Ferrol with the frigate HMS Ethalion. On 13 September she took the 6-gun lugger Le St Jacques after she was sighted while leaving L'Orient; St Jacques was carrying 662 13-inch shells to Rochefort.Schomberg, Naval Chronology, p. 84

On 15 October at 8 p.m. the Spanish 34-gun frigates Thetis and Santa Brigida were sighted by Naiad around Cape Finisterre.Clowes, The Royal Navy, Vol. 4, pp. 525-6 The two were travelling from the area of Vera-Cruz in New Spain with cargoes of treasure bound for any accessible Spanish port. Naiad began a chase of the Spaniards, and by the morning of 16 October had been joined by another frigate, HMS Alcmene; these two ships were then spotted by Triton and Ethalion who also joined the chase.Clowes, The Royal Navy, Vol. 4, pp. 525-6 At 7 a.m. Thetis and Santa Brigida split up to make their capture more difficult; the senior British officer Captain William Pierrepoint of Naiad ordered the leading ship, Ethalion, to ignore the closer Santa Brigida and instead chase Thetis.James, Naval History, Vol. 2, pp. 402-3 By 11:30 a.m. Ethalion was so close to Thetis that she was forced to engage and after a running fight of one hour, in which no Britons and only one Frenchman were killed, Thetis surrendered to Ethalion.

While Ethalion chased Thetis, Santa Brigida took a more southerly route of escape and by 17 October had managed to round Cape Finisterre. In order to do so she had run incredibly close to the rocks of the coast. Triton was the closest of the three British ships in pursuit, and took a similar course to Santa Brigida, however at 5 a.m. she grounded while going at a rate of seven knots, causing damage to her hull. By 7 a.m. Gore had managed to get Triton off of the rocks, and she began to fire at Santa Brigida. Alcmene in the meanwhile had sailed to cut Santa Brigida off from the coast, and the two British frigates began to attack her from either side. Santa Brigida attempted to escape, throwing her boats and anchors overboard to save weight and making elaborate manoeuvres among the rocks of Commarurto, but by 8 a.m. Naiad had engaged as well, and Santa Brigida surrendered off the entrance to Muros. Similarly to Ethalions fight, the casualties involved were very limited. Triton was severely damaged with much water coming in from her grounding, but only had one man wounded during the action.Duncan, British Trident, p. 196 Naiad did not close enough to receive casualties, while Alcmene had one seaman killed and nine wounded, and Santa Brigida two killed and eight wounded.

The action took place within sight of the Spanish squadron at Vigo. Upon seeing Santa Brigida captured, five of the squadron left port in an attempt to recapture her. Santa Brigida was taken in tow by Triton with Naiad ahead and Alcmene behind her. The ships prepared to fight off the Spanish squadron, but upon seeing their intent to defend their prize, the Spanish returned to Vigo. Around this time, Triton recaptured the American ship Abigail while in company with the same three frigates and detained another American, Polly.Clarke, Naval Chronicle Vol. 2, p. 541

On 21 October Thetis arrived at Plymouth, with Santa Brigida following one day later. While the ships were not bought into the Royal Navy, their true value was in their cargo. The treasure on board the two frigates exceeded £600,000 and included around 877 boxes of Spanish dollars, two bales of indigo, twenty-six of cochineal, twenty-three of cocoa, and sixteen of sugar. Sixty-three wagons were required to hold the large amount of treasure when it was transported to London. When proportioned for the crews this meant that Captain Gore alone received £40,730, which was an incredible amount.

Incident off BrittanyTriton was docked and repaired and then sent to join the Channel Fleet off Brest once more. On 11 February 1800 she took the 14-gun brig La Vidette, which had previously been the British privateer Thought, as she travelled from Brest to L'Orient.Schomberg, Naval Chronology, p. 85

Around 12 March, Triton was chasing a cutter off the Penmarks when one of her 12-pounder guns burst upon firing. The explosion created a number of large splinters which killed the ship's second lieutenant, Lieutenant Alford, and a gunner's mate. Alford had been dining with Captain Gore, and was opening the door to leave the captain's cabin when the explosion blew his head off. Eighteen other members of Triton's crew were wounded in the accident, and a large section of the deck was ripped up  as well as the captain's cabin being damaged. The wounded were taken to the Royal Naval Hospital; Alford and the gunner's mate were buried there on 13 March.

By 15 March Triton was cruising with the gun boat HMS Fowey and the cutter Joseph. Fowey was damaged in a gale and left the station off Brittany, leaving Triton and Joseph to attempt to burn the remains of the ship-of-the-line HMS Repulse which had been lost on rocks off the coast on 10 March.Clarke, Naval Chronicle Vol. 3, p. 326 The ships failed in doing so, as the French brought a battery of guns to bear on them from above the wreck of Repulse. On 15 April the trader San Sebastian arrived at Plymouth having been taken by Triton and fellow frigate HMS Stag while attempting a voyage from Santander. By July Triton was the lead frigate of the inshore squadron, reporting the movements of the combined fleet in Brest to Lord St Vincent.

Later service
In the spring of 1801 Captain Gore was replaced in Triton by Captain Robert Lewis Fitzgerald after reporting himself too fatigued from the heavy service of Triton to go back to sea.Winfield, British Warships, p. 478 She continued to serve in the Channel, taking the French letter of marque Le Jeune Theodore on 15 September 1801. Triton was not deemed a success on this commission and was paid off in April 1802.

From July 1803 to 1809 Triton was commanded by Commander William Cashman; she was fitted as a receiving ship at Woolwich in September 1803, likely because of the wear on the ship caused by her experimental design. By this time the ship's armament had been decreased to twelve nine-pounders and ten twenty four-pound carronades only. In 1807 Triton was the guard ship at Waterford; at the beginning of the Anglo-Russian War on 2 September she successfully detained the ships Norway Lion and Karen Helena. Her final service was as receiving ship at Plymouth from August 1810.Winfield, British Warships, p. 478

FateTriton was either sold at Plymouth for £1,870 on 3 November 1814 or hulked in 1817 and broken up in Newfoundland in 1820.

Prizes
{| class="wikitable" style="width:85%; align-center"
!colspan="6" | Vessels captured or destroyed for which Triton's crew received full or partial credit
|-
! Date|| Ship || Nationality|| Type ||Fate || Ref.
|-
| 10 February 1797
| Recovery|  French
| 14-gun privateer cutter
| Captured
|
|-
| 10 February 1797
| Atlantic|  American
| Merchant vessel
| Recaptured
|
|-
| 11 February 1797
| Jeune Emilie|  French
| 10-gun privateer brig
| Captured
|
|-
| 12 February 1797
| La Difficile|  French
| 18-gun privateer
| Captured
|
|-
| 12 June 1797
| La Zoes|  French
| Merchant vessel
| Captured
|
|-
| 25 July 1797
| Boston| Not recorded
| Not recorded
| Captured
|
|-
| 11 August 1797
| Not recorded
|  French
| Gun boat
| Destroyed
|
|-
| 12 August 1797
| Admiralitat|  Dutch
| Merchant vessel
| Captured
|
|-
| 4–29 August 1797
| Trois Soeurs|  French
| Not recorded
| Captured
|
|-
| 4–29 August 1797
| Egalité|  French
| Not recorded
| Captured
|
|-
| 4–29 August 1797
| St. Peter|  French
| Not recorded
| Captured
|
|-
| 4–29 August 1797
| St. Ann|  French
| Not recorded
| Captured
|
|-
| 4–29 August 1797
| Furet|  French
| Not recorded
| Captured
|
|-
| 4–29 August 1797
| Dauphin|  French
| Not recorded
| Captured
|
|-
| 28 August 1797
| Le Petit Diable|  French
| 18-gun cutter
| Destroyed
|
|-
| 14 October 1797
| Le Furet|  French
| 4-gun privateer
| Captured
|
|-
| December 1797
| La Helene|  French
| Privateer
| Captured
|
|-
| 28 September 1798
| L'Arraigne|  French
| 5-gun schooner
| Captured
|
|-
| 11–12 December 1798
| St. Joseph|  Spanish
| 4-gun privateer
| Captured
|
|-
| 11–12 December 1798
| La Rosée|  French
| 14-gun privateer brig
| Captured
|
|-
| 11–12 December 1798
| George|  British
| Merchant vessel
| Recaptured
|
|-
| 31 December 1798
| L'Impromptu|  French
| 14-gun privateer brig
| Captured
|
|-
| December 1798
| Succés|  French
| Privateer
| Captured
|
|-
| 29 January 1799
| Not recorded
| Not recorded
| 16-gun cutter
| Captured
|
|-
| 30 January 1799
| L'Aimable Victoire|  French
| 18-gun ship
| Captured
|
|-
|13 March 1799
| Victoire|  French
| Merchant brig
| Captured
|
|-
|March 1799
| San Joachim|  Spanish
| Merchant brig
| Captured
|
|-
| 18 June 1799
| Courageuse
|  French
| 32-gun frigate
| Captured
|
|-
| 18 June 1799
| Alceste
|  French
| 32-gun frigate
| Captured
|
|-
| 18 June 1799
| Junon
|  French
| 40-gun frigate
| Captured
|
|-
| 18 June 1799
| Salamine
|  French
| 18-gun brig
| Captured
|
|-
| 18 June 1799
| Alerte
|  French
| 14-gun brig
| Captured
|
|-
| 13 September 1799
| Le St Jacques|  French
| 6-gun lugger
| Captured
|
|-
| 16 October 1799
| Santa Brigida|  Spanish
| 34-gun frigate
| Captured
|
|-
| October 1799
| Abigail|  American
| Merchant vessel
| Recaptured
|
|-
| October 1799
| Polly|  American
| Not recorded
| Detained
|
|-
| 11 February 1800
| La Vidette
|  French
| 14-gun brig
| Captured
|
|-
| April 1800
| San Sebastian|  Spanish
| Merchant vessel
| Captured
|
|-
| 15 September 1801
| Le Jeune Theodore|  French
| Letter of marque
| Captured
|
|-
| 2 September 1807
| Norway Lion|  Danish
| Merchant vessel
| Detained
|
|-
| 2 September 1807
| Karen Helena|  Danish
| Merchant vessel
| Detained
|
|}

Notes and citations
Notes

Citations

References

 Austen-Leigh, William and Richard Arthur Austen-Leigh (1989) Jane Austen, a Family Record. New York: Barnes and Noble. 
 
 Clarke, James Stanier and John McArthur (1799) The Naval Chronicle: Containing a General and Biographical History of the Royal Navy of the United Kingdom with a Variety of Original Papers on Nautical Subjects Volume 1: January–July 1799. Cambridge: Cambridge University Press. 
 Clarke, James Stanier and John McArthur (1799) The Naval Chronicle: Containing a General and Biographical History of the Royal Navy of the United Kingdom with a Variety of Original Papers on Nautical Subjects Volume 2: July–December 1799. Cambridge: Cambridge University Press. 
 Clarke, James Stanier and John McArthur (1800) The Naval Chronicle: Containing a General and Biographical History of the Royal Navy of the United Kingdom with a Variety of Original Papers on Nautical Subjects Volume 3: January–July 1800. Cambridge: Cambridge University Press. 
 Clarke, James Stanier and John McArthur (1800) The Naval Chronicle: Containing a General and Biographical History of the Royal Navy of the United Kingdom with a Variety of Original Papers on Nautical Subjects Volume 4: July–December 1800. Cambridge: Cambridge University Press. 
 Clowes, William Laird (1899) The Royal Navy: A History from the Earliest Times to 1900 Volume Four. London: Sampson Low, Marston and Company. 
 Colledge, J.J. and Ben Warlow (2010) Ships of the Royal Navy. Newbury: Casemate. 
  
 Duncan, Archibald (1805) The British Trident; or, Register of Naval Actions; including Authentic Accounts of all the most Remarkable Engagements at Sea, in which The British Flag has been Eminently Distinguished; from the period of the memorable Defeat of the Spanish Armada, to the Present Time. Volume IV. London: James Cundee.
 Fremont-Barnes, Gregory (2005) Nelson's Sailors. Oxford: Osprey Publishing. 
 Gardiner, Robert (1992) The First Frigates: Nine-pounder & Twelve-pounder Frigates 1748-1815. London: Conway Maritime Press. 
 Gardiner, Robert (1994) The Heavy Frigate: Eighteen-Pounder Frigates: Vol I, 1778-1800. London: Conway Maritime Press. 
 Henderson, James (1970) The Frigates. London:  A & C Black. 
 James, William (1859) The Naval History of Great Britain, Volume 2. Cambridge: Cambridge University Press. 
 Lavery, Brian (1989) Nelson's Navy: The Ships, Men and Organisation 1793-1815. London: Conway Maritime Press. 
 Marshall, John (1823) Royal Naval Biography: or, Memoirs of the Services of all the Flag-Officers, Superannuated Rear-Admirals, Retired-Captains, Post-Captains, and Commanders Volume 1 - Part 1. Cambridge: Cambridge University Press. 
 Marshall, John (1823) Royal Naval Biography: or, Memoirs of the Services of all the Flag-Officers, Superannuated Rear-Admirals, Retired-Captains, Post-Captains, and Commanders Volume 1 - Part 2. Cambridge: Cambridge University Press. 
 
 
 
 
 
 Wareham, Thomas Nigel Ralph (1999) The Frigate Captains of the Royal Navy, 1793-1815.'' Unpublished doctoral thesis, University of Exeter.

External links
 
 Ships of the Old Navy

1796 ships
Ships built in Deptford
Fifth-rate frigates of the Royal Navy